The Fencing Master (French Le Maître d'armes) is a nineteenth century novel by Alexandre Dumas and published in 1840–1842. The novel is set in Russia.

References

Novels by Alexandre Dumas
Novels set in Russia
1842 French novels